Madonna University is a private Roman Catholic university in Livonia, Michigan. It was founded as the Presentation of the Blessed Virgin Mary Junior College by the Felician Sisters in 1937. It became Madonna College in 1947 and Madonna University in 1991.

Among the largest Franciscan universities in the country, Madonna is situated on an 80-acre (32 ha) wooded campus. It has extension campuses in Metro Detroit in southwest Detroit, Orchard Lake, and Clinton Township at the Macomb University Center.

Academics
Founded by two sisters in 1937 as Presentation of the Blessed Virgin Mary College, the university offers more than 100 undergraduate majors toward associate and bachelor's degrees as well as 35 master's programs in clinical psychology, business, criminal justice, education, history, and health professions.  In May 2009, Madonna began offering its first doctorate, the Doctor of Nursing Practice. Madonna's most popular undergraduate majors, by 2021 graduates, were:
Registered Nursing/Registered Nurse (281)
Business Administration and Management (62)
Criminal Justice/Safety Studies (53)
International Business/Trade/Commerce (41)
Social Work (22)
General Studies (18)
Biology/Biological Sciences (16)

Madonna University's commitment to developing a sustainable and eco-friendly campus was recognized when the U.S. Green Building Council awarded Gold level LEED® (Leadership in Energy and Environmental Design) certification for the university's  Franciscan Center.

Colleges and schools
The university is organized into the following colleges and schools:

 College of Arts & Sciences
 College of Education & Human Development
 College of Nursing and Health
 Graduate School
 School of Business

Campus media

Print publications
The Madonna Now is the university's magazine for alumni and friends. The Madonna Herald is the university's newspaper, which is produced by Madonna's Journalism Department, headed by professor Neal Haldane. The Madonna Muse is an annual literary journal.

Radio
In the university's Franciscan Center studios, students operate an online radio station at Live 365. The format is freeform, and features occasional live broadcasts from students of the program.

Television
The Broadcast and Cinema Arts students produce a television show, Celebrate Michigan, which airs on MyTV20 in the Detroit area.

Athletics
The Madonna athletic teams are the Crusaders. The university is a member of the National Association of Intercollegiate Athletics (NAIA), competing in the Wolverine–Hoosier Athletic Conference (WHAC) for most of its sports since the 1997–98 academic year; while its football team competes in the Mideast League of the Mid-States Football Association (MSFA).

Madonna competes in 21 intercollegiate varsity sports: Men's sports include baseball, basketball, bowling, cheerleading, cross country, football, golf, lacrosse, soccer and track & Field; while women's sports include basketball, bowling, cheerleading, competitive Dance, cross country, golf, lacrosse, soccer, softball, track & field and volleyball.

Football
Madonna added football to its program in the 2020 season.

Facilities
The campus features a renovated basketball and volleyball gymnasium, Alliance Catholic Credit Union Arena at the Performing Arts, Academics, and Athletics Center, with a capacity of 1,200; international-size soccer field, which hosts camps and tournaments; Ilitch Ballpark baseball field and fast-pitch softball field.

Notable alumni 
 Lyn Bankes, former member of the Michigan House of Representatives
 Kerry Bentivolio, former US Representative for Michigan's 11th congressional district (as an alumnus of Saint Mary's College)
 Ella Bully-Cummings, former chief of the Detroit Police Department
 Nora Chapa Mendoza, artist
 Chris Dierker, Vietnam Basketball Association player
 Warren Evans, Michigan politician and police officer
 Vincent Gregory, former member of the Michigan Senate
 Charlie Henry, basketball coach
Kevin Foley (former baseball player/outfielder/coach) (1995-1998) (2001-2003) (2015-2017) 
 Worteh Sampson, soccer player and coach
 Robert C. Schuler, advertising executive (alumnus of Saint Mary's College)
 John Vigilante, National Hockey League player
 Catherine Waynick, Anglican bishop

References

External links
 Official website
 Official athletics website

 
Franciscan universities and colleges
Livonia, Michigan
Catholic universities and colleges in Michigan
Universities and colleges in Wayne County, Michigan
Association of Catholic Colleges and Universities
Internet radio stations in the United States
Non-profit organizations based in Michigan
Polish-American history
Educational institutions established in 1937
Roman Catholic Archdiocese of Detroit
1937 establishments in Michigan